Cyperus odoratus is a species of sedge known by the common names fragrant flatsedge and rusty flatsedge. This plant can be found in much of the tropical and warm temperate world, including South, Central, and North America, Southeast Asia, some Pacific Islands, Australia, New Guinea, Madagascar, and central Africa. It is a plant of wet, muddy areas, including disturbed and altered sites. This species is quite variable and may in fact be more than one species included under one name. In general this is an annual plant approaching half a meter in height on average but known to grow much taller. It usually has some long, thin leaves around the base. The inflorescence is made up of one to several cylindrical spikes attached at a common point. Each of the spikes bears a large number of flat, oval-shaped spikelets. Each spikelet is usually light brown to reddish-brown and has a few to over 20 flowers. Each flower is covered by a tough, flat bract with a visible midvein. The fruit is a flat achene less than two millimeters long.

See also
 List of Cyperus species

References

External links

USDA Plants Profile
Photo gallery

odoratus
Flora of North America
Flora of South America
Flora of Africa
Flora of Australia
Flora of Madagascar
Flora of New Guinea
Plants described in 1753
Taxa named by Carl Linnaeus